Agrotis experta is a moth of the family Noctuidae. It is found in the Tarapacá and Antofagasta regions of Chile and the Callao District of Peru.

The wingspan is 40–60 mm. Adults are on wing from April to October.

The larvae have been recorded on beet, sesame, alfalfa, cotton, kidney bean, Solanum tuberosum and tobacco.

External links
 Noctuinae of Chile

Agrotis
Moths of South America
Moths described in 1869